Pavithran is an Indian film director, who has made many hit Tamil films. He was active primarily in the 1990s collaborating in ventures which often included Sarathkumar in pivotal roles. He was awarded the Tamil Nadu state Kalaimamani award for his works in the film industry.

Career
Pavithran a student of Pachaiyappa's college began his career with K. T. Kunjumon's production venture Vasanthakala Paravai (1991), before going on to make a successful action film with Sarathkumar titled Suriyan (1992) which went on to become the biggest hit of the year, cementing his position in kollywood and then re-collaborated with the actor the following year with I Love India (1993). Sarathkumar also featured in his next, the romantic musical Indhu (1994), which marked the debut of Prabhu Deva as a lead actor. In 1995, he made another action film with Vijayakanth titled Thirumoorthy.

He then made the college love story Kalloori Vaasal (1996) featuring Ajith Kumar, Prashanth and Pooja Bhatt, though the film opened to a negative response from critics and at the box office. During the making of the film, the director clashed with actor Prashanth and his father, with the pair claiming that Pavithran had changed the characterisation of Prashanth's role in the film since the first narration. In 1996, he also produced the Vijay-starrer Selva directed by A. Venkatesh, but the film's failure cost Pavithran 1.5 crore rupees. This also affected the making of his next venture titled Mookkuththi Kaasi, which started with Sarathkumar, but was later filmed with Bhaskar Raj in the lead instead. The film subsequently failed to develop and did not release. His final Tamil film before an extended sabbatical was the Vignesh-starrer Kadhal Palli.

In 2000, he announced a project titled Pugazh again with Sarathkumar, Poonam Singar and Sanghavi, but the project failed to proceed after initial schedules. The firm had been partially shot in Fiji with the story inspired by the 2000 Fijian coup d'état. He re-began work on the film in March 2004 with actor Jai and Sherin also brought in alongside Sarathkumar, but the film still failed to be completed.

Pavithran began work on a low budget film titled Mattuthavani in 2007, though delays meant that the film only had a low key release in 2012. In 2018, he released another small-budget film titled Dharavi, shot in Mumbai.

Filmography

References

Living people
Tamil film directors
20th-century Indian film directors
Tamil screenwriters
Year of birth missing (living people)